Mountain Lakes is a borough in Morris County, in the U.S. state of New Jersey, and a suburb of New York City. As of the 2020 United States census, the borough's population was 4,472, an increase of 312 (+7.5%) from the 2010 census count of 4,160, which in turn reflected a decline of 96 (−2.3%) from the 4,256 counted in the 2000 census.

Originally a planned community, the borough was named for a pair of lakes which served to distinguish Mountain Lakes as "the first year-round residential lake community in northwestern New Jersey." Mountain Lakes was incorporated as a borough by an act of the New Jersey Legislature on March 3, 1924, from portions of Boonton Township and Hanover Township, subject to the results of a referendum passed on April 29, 1924.

The borough has been one of the state's highest-income communities. In the 2013–2017 American Community Survey, Mountain Lakes had a median household income of $175,556 (ranked 12th in the state) and included 45.6% of households earning more than $200,000 annually.

In 2010, Forbes.com listed Mountain Lakes as 210th in its listing of "America's Most Expensive ZIP Codes", with a median home price of $1,045,401.

Mountain Lakes ranked among the highest annual property tax bills in New Jersey, and was the highest in Morris County, at $20,471 in 2018, compared to a statewide average of $8,767. New Jersey Monthly magazine ranked Mountain Lakes as the 26th best place to live in New Jersey in its rankings of the "New Jersey's Top Towns 2011–2012" in New Jersey.

Mountain Lakes station is the first train station heading eastbound not concurrent with the nearby Morristown Line. NJ Transit offers service on the Montclair-Boonton Line.

History

Grimes Homestead is an 18th-century historic home that served as a way station on the Underground Railroad.

Mountain Lakes was originally a planned community, founded in 1910 by Herbert Hapgood. The entire face of the community changed from a wilderness of Dutch and English properties to a planned suburban community of large stucco houses now affectionately known as "Hapgoods." During this single decade, the natural and architectural character of Mountain Lakes was developed. Hapgood was particularly influenced by the Arts and Crafts movement, at the height of its popularity in 1910 when he started building.

Lawrence W. Luellen, inventor of the Dixie Cup, became the community's first resident when he moved to his new home in March 1911.

The Hapgood model homes were early forerunners of the modern development, but each house was modified to suit individual tastes. To the basic styles of these houses, Hapgood added colonial and craftsman features.  He reversed floor plans, and interchanged architectural details. By the end of 1912, two hundred Hapgood homes were sold and occupied and in 1914 saw the formation of the Mountain Lakes Club. By 1923, approximately six hundred stucco houses were built to meet the overwhelming demand. Mountain Lakes became an independent municipality in 1924.

The United States Navy's Underwater Sound Reference Laboratories was located in Mountain Lakes during World War II.

Mountain Lakes had a discriminatory "gentleman's agreement" from its inception up through the 1960s, preventing African-Americans, Jews, Latinos, Catholics, and other "undesirable groupings" from living there. While this was abandoned in recent years, the town still has a less diverse population than the rest of New Jersey, or Morris County.

Geography
According to the United States Census Bureau, the borough had a total area of 2.91 square miles (7.53 km2), including 2.64 square miles (6.84 km2) of land and 0.27 square miles (0.69 km2) of water (9.11%).

Part of The Tourne county park is in Mountain Lakes.

The borough borders Parsippany-Troy Hills, to the east and south, the town of Boonton to the northeast, Boonton Township to the northwest and Denville to the west all of which are located in Morris County.

Lakes
Man-made lakes in Mountain Lakes include Birchwood Lake, Crystal Lake, Mountain Lake, Shadow Lake, Sunset Lake, Wildwood Lake, and Cove Lake. There are town private swimming beaches in Birchwood Lake, and Mountain Lake. The Mountain Lakes Club is located on the northern end of Mountain Lake.

Beaches are open from sunrise to sunset and facilities are available between the hours of 10 AM to 6 PM every day between the months of June and August with a beach badge purchased at the borough hall. Beach badges are available to Mountain Lakes residents only.

Demographics

According to The New York Times, a diverse group of foreigners have been moving to the borough, including Germans, Chinese, South Africans, and New Zealanders.

2010 census

The Census Bureau's 2006–2010 American Community Survey showed that (in 2010 inflation-adjusted dollars) median household income was $155,139 (with a margin of error of +/− $20,127) and the median family income was $181,600 (+/− $26,906). Males had a median income of $144,688 (+/− $24,336) versus $77,734 (+/− $26,273) for females. The per capita income for the borough was $75,525 (+/− $11,503). About 2.1% of families and 2.1% of the population were below the poverty line, including 2.0% of those under age 18 and 5.2% of those age 65 or over.

Based on data from the 2006-2010 American Community Survey, Mountain Lakes had a per capita income of $75,525 (ranked 17th in the state), compared to per capita income in Morris County of $47,342 and statewide of $34,858.

2000 census
As of the 2000 United States census there were 4,256 people, 1,330 households, and 1,186 families residing in the borough. The population density was 1,593.0 people per square mile (615.4/km2). There were 1,357 housing units at an average density of 507.9 per square mile (196.2/km2). The racial makeup of the borough was 93.05% White, 0.38% African American, 5.17% Asian, 0.07% Pacific Islander, 0.52% from other races, and 0.82% from two or more races. Hispanic or Latino of any race were 1.69% of the population.

There were 1,330 households, out of which 53.7% had children under the age of 18 living with them, 83.3% were married couples living together, 3.8% had a female householder with no husband present, and 10.8% were non-families. 9.2% of all households were made up of individuals, and 4.1% had someone living alone who was 65 years of age or older. The average household size was 3.20 and the average family size was 3.41.

In the borough the population was spread out, with 35.7% under the age of 18, 3.1% from 18 to 24, 23.4% from 25 to 44, 28.7% from 45 to 64, and 9.1% who were 65 years of age or older. The median age was 39 years. For every 100 females, there were 99.2 males. For every 100 females age 18 and over, there were 94.0 males.

The median income for a household in the borough was $141,757, and the median income for a family was $153,227. Males had a median income of $100,000+ versus $61,098 for females. The per capita income for the borough was $65,086. About 1.4% of families and 2.0% of the population were below the poverty line, including 0.7% of those under age 18 and 2.3% of those age 65 or over.

Mountain Lakes was ranked in 2000 as the 13th highest-income community in the state of New Jersey based on per capita income, after having been ranked eighth a decade earlier. In 2000, the township's median household income ranked third in the state and the highest in Morris County. Per capita income increased by 25.4% from the previous census, with income growth ranked 530th among the state's 566 municipalities.

Government

Local government
Mountain Lakes operates within the Faulkner Act, formally known as the Optional Municipal Charter Law, under the Council-Manager form of municipal government (Plan E), implemented based on the recommendations of a Charter Study Commission as of January 1, 1975. The borough is one of 42 municipalities (of the 564) statewide that use this form of government. The Borough Council is comprised of seven members, who are elected at-large for staggered four-year terms of office on a partisan basis, with either three or four seats coming up for vote as part of the November general election in even-numbered years. The Mayor and Deputy Mayor are chosen by the members of the Council from among its members at a reorganization meeting held each year during the first week in January.

, members of the Mountain Lakes Borough Council are Mayor Thomas Menard (D, term on committee and as mayor ends December 31, 2022), Deputy mayor Khizar Sheikh (D, term on committee ends 2024; term as deputy mayor ends 2022), Lauren Barnett (D, 2024), Daniel J. Happer (R, 2022), Cynthia Korman (D, 2024), Audrey B. Lane (R, 2022) and Chris Richter (R, 2024).

In 2018, the borough had an average property tax bill of $20,471, the highest in the county, compared to an average bill of $8,767 statewide.

Federal, state and county representation
Mountain Lakes is located in the 11th Congressional District and is part of New Jersey's 25th state legislative district.

 

Morris County is governed by a Board of County Commissioners comprised of seven members who are elected at-large in partisan elections to three-year terms on a staggered basis, with either one or three seats up for election each year as part of the November general election. Actual day-to-day operation of departments is supervised by County Administrator, John Bonanni. , Morris County's Commissioners are
Commissioner Director Tayfun Selen (R, Chatham Township, term as commissioner ends December 31, 2023; term as director ends 2022),
Commissioner Deputy Director John Krickus (R, Washington Township, term as commissioner ends 2024; term as deputy director ends 2022),
Douglas Cabana (R, Boonton Township, 2022), 
Kathryn A. DeFillippo (R, Roxbury, 2022),
Thomas J. Mastrangelo (R, Montville, 2022),
Stephen H. Shaw (R, Mountain Lakes, 2024) and
Deborah Smith (R, Denville, 2024).
The county's constitutional officers are the County Clerk and County Surrogate (both elected for five-year terms of office) and the County Sheriff (elected for a three-year term). , they are 
County Clerk Ann F. Grossi (R, Parsippany–Troy Hills, 2023),
Sheriff James M. Gannon (R, Boonton Township, 2022) and
Surrogate Heather Darling (R, Roxbury, 2024).

Politics
As of March 2011, there were a total of 2,964 registered voters in Mountain Lakes, of which 715 (24.1%) were registered as Democrats, 975 (32.9%) were registered as Republicans and 1,271 (42.9%) were registered as Unaffiliated. There were 3 voters registered as Libertarians or Greens.

In the 2012 presidential election, Republican Mitt Romney received 58.0% of the vote (1,262 cast), ahead of Democrat Barack Obama with 41.1% (893 votes), and other candidates with 0.9% (19 votes), among the 2,184 ballots cast by the borough's 3,125 registered voters (10 ballots were spoiled), for a turnout of 69.9%. In the 2008 presidential election, Democrat Barack Obama received 49.2% of the vote (1,177 cast), ahead of Republican John McCain with 49.1% (1,173 votes) and other candidates with 1.1% (27 votes), among the 2,391 ballots cast by the borough's 3,103 registered voters, for a turnout of 77.1%. In the 2004 presidential election, Republican George W. Bush received 55.1% of the vote (1,299 ballots cast), outpolling Democrat John Kerry with 43.6% (1,027 votes) and other candidates with 0.7% (21 votes), among the 2,356 ballots cast by the borough's 3,018 registered voters, for a turnout percentage of 78.1.

In the 2013 gubernatorial election, Republican Chris Christie received 71.4% of the vote (935 cast), ahead of Democrat Barbara Buono with 26.6% (349 votes), and other candidates with 2.0% (26 votes), among the 1,325 ballots cast by the borough's 3,036 registered voters (15 ballots were spoiled), for a turnout of 43.6%. In the 2009 gubernatorial election, Republican Chris Christie received 57.1% of the vote (937 ballots cast), ahead of  Democrat Jon Corzine with 32.3% (530 votes), Independent Chris Daggett with 10.0% (164 votes) and other candidates with 0.4% (6 votes), among the 1,642 ballots cast by the borough's 3,024 registered voters, yielding a 54.3% turnout.

Education
The Mountain Lakes Schools serve public school students in pre-kindergarten through twelfth grade. As of the 2020–21 school year, the district, comprised of four schools, had an enrollment of 1,348 students and 146.7 classroom teachers (on an FTE basis), for a student–teacher ratio of 9.2:1. Schools in the district (with 2020–21 enrollment data from the National Center for Education Statistics) are 
Wildwood Elementary School with 428 students in grades K–5, 
Briarcliff Middle School with 281 students in grades 6–8, 
Mountain Lakes High School with 641 students in grades 9–12 and 
Lake Drive School, a regional school for deaf and hard of hearing students from birth through high school, with students from nearly 100 communities in 12 New Jersey counties. with 57 students in grades Pre-K–8. Students from Boonton Township attend the district's high school as part of a sending/receiving relationship. The school was the 7th-ranked public high school in New Jersey out of 328 schools statewide in New Jersey Monthly magazine's September 2012 cover story on the state's "Top Public High Schools", after being ranked 9th in 2010 out of 322 schools listed.

Mountain Lakes is also home to The Craig School, a private coeducational day school serving students in second through twelfth grade. The school has an enrollment of 130 students split between the Lower/Middle School (grades 2–8), located in Mountain Lakes, and the High School (grades 9–12), in Boonton.

According to Neighborhood Scout, Mountain Lakes is one of New Jersey's most highly educated municipalities, with 85.94% of adults attaining a four-year undergraduate or graduate degree, quadruple the national average of 21.84%, while the percentage of white-collar workers was 98.77%.

Transportation

Roads and highways

U.S. Route 46 is the main highway directly serving Mountain Lakes. No other significant roads enter the borough. However, Interstate 80 and Interstate 287 both pass just outside the borough in neighboring Parsippany–Troy Hills.

Public transportation
NJ Transit offers train service at the Mountain Lakes station on the Montclair-Boonton Line to Hoboken Terminal and to Pennsylvania Station in Midtown Manhattan via Midtown Direct through Newark Broad Street Station.

Lakeland Bus Lines provides service along Route 46 operating between Dover and the Port Authority Bus Terminal in Midtown Manhattan.

Notable people

People who were born in, residents of, or otherwise closely associated with Mountain Lakes include:

 Frederick Walker Castle (1908–1944), general officer in the United States Army Air Forces during World War II, and a recipient of the Medal of Honor
 Mark Di Ionno (born 1956), journalist and writer
 Frederick Elmes (born 1946), cinematographer who won the Independent Spirit Award for Best Cinematography for Wild at Heart and Night on Earth
 Richard M. Freeland (born 1941), President of Northeastern University from 1996 to 2006
 Jeff Friesen (born 1976), professional hockey player who has played for the New Jersey Devils
 Marc Lore (born 1971), billionaire entrepreneur and founder of the e-commerce company Jet
 Claire McCusker Murray (born 1982), lawyer who was associate White House counsel and acting associate attorney general in the United States Department of Justice during the Presidency of Donald Trump
 Mike Michalowicz (born 1970), author and entrepreneur
 Lindsey Munday (born 1984), former collegiate women's lacrosse player who won two national championships at Northwestern and has served since 2013 as the inaugural head coach of the USC Trojans women's lacrosse team
 Harry L. Sears (1920–2002), politician who served for 10 years in the New Jersey Legislature, and was indicted on charges of bribery and conspiracy stemming for delivering $200,000 from financier Robert Vesco to Richard Nixon's 1972 presidential campaign
 Matt Taibbi (born 1970), author, journalist and podcaster
 Brittany Underwood (born 1988), actress and singer best known for her role as teenager Langston Wilde on the daytime soap opera One Life to Live
 Adam Zucker (born 1976), sportscaster for CBS Sports and CBS Sports Network

References

External links

 
1924 establishments in New Jersey
Boroughs in Morris County, New Jersey
Faulkner Act (council–manager)
Populated places established in 1924
Populated places on the Underground Railroad
Historic districts in Morris County, New Jersey
Historic districts on the National Register of Historic Places in New Jersey
National Register of Historic Places in Morris County, New Jersey